Orphilus is a genus of beetles native to the Palearctic (including Europe) and the Near East. It contains the following species:

 Orphilus africanus Háva, 2005
 Orphilus ater Erichson, 1848
 Orphilus beali Zhantiev, 2001
 Orphilus dubius Wickham, 1912
 Orphilus niger (Rossi, 1790)
 Orphilus subnitidus LeConte, 1861

References

External links
Orphilus at Fauna Europaea

Dermestidae genera